Carlos Nicanor Toppings Toppings  (7 April 1953 — 24 August 2007) was a Costa Rican professional footballer.

Club career
Born in the Caribbean coastal town Limón, Toppings made his professional debut in 1974 for hometown club Limonense and had a lengthy spell at Municipal Puntarenas. He also had short stints at Herediano and San Carlos.

Toppings won the 1986 Primera Division de Costa Rica title with Puntarenas.

International career
Toppings made 32 appearances for the full Costa Rica national football team from 1979 to 1984. He also played at the 1980 and 1984 Olympic Games.

Retirement and death
After retiring as a player he worked at a customs agency in Limón harbour. He was unmarried but had a daughter, Violeta, and died in San José, Costa Rica, aged 54 due to a lung problem.

References

External links
 

1953 births
2007 deaths
People from Limón Province
Association football defenders
Costa Rican footballers
Costa Rica international footballers
Olympic footballers of Costa Rica
Footballers at the 1980 Summer Olympics
Footballers at the 1984 Summer Olympics
Puntarenas F.C. players
C.S. Herediano footballers
A.D. San Carlos footballers
Deaths from lung disease